Europe inherited a diversity of rail gauges. Extensive narrow-gauge railway networks exist in Spain, Central Europe and Southeastern Europe.

Austria 

Some two dozen lines were built in  gauge, a few in  gauge.

Bulgaria 

From the 19th into the early 20th there were many  and  gauge railways in existence Bulgaria, some were dismantled and others were converted to standard gauge.

The picturesque Septemvri–Dobrinishte narrow-gauge line is 125 km long and features 25 stations, 35 tunnels, many bridges, spiral loops. It is the only remaining  gauge railway in Bulgaria.

Belarus 

Some industrial narrow-gauge railways and a children's railway can still be found in Belarus particularly associated with the peat extraction industry.

 World War I  field railway from Dūkštas, (Lithuania) to Druja. After World War II the large part of the line was in Belorussia, the railway closed in the 1970s.
 Minsk pioneer railway,  gauge, opened in 1955, 4 km.
 Rudensk peat railway,  gauge, opened in 1929, 111 km of which 40 km is operational

Belgium 

The Vicinal or Buurtspoorwegen were a system of narrow-gauge local railways or tramways covering the whole country and having a greater routage than the mainline railway system. They were  gauge and the system included electrified city lines as well as rural lines using steam locomotives and railcars; half of the system was electrified. Many lines carried freight. Only the coastal line and two routes near Charleroi are still in commercial use, four museums hold significant collections of former SNCV/NMVB rolling stock, one of which is the ASVi museum in Thuin. The tramway networks in Antwerp and Ghent are also metre gauge.

The Stoomcentrum Maldegem has a  gauge line laid on the former standard-gauge trackbed to Donk.

Bosnia and Herzegovina 

Until the 1970s, Bosnia and Herzegovina had an extensive  gauge network exceeding 1500 km.

Croatia 

Croatia had three Bosnian gauge railways, a  tram and some  gauge mining railways.

Czech Republic 

Several lines were built in the nineteenth century. The most notable lines are Obrataň-Jindřichův Hradec-Nová Bystřice and Třemešná ve Slezsku-Osoblaha, that are still in operation.

Denmark 

A few narrow-gauge lines were built in Denmark, the majority in  gauge. Most railway lines in Denmark were built with standard gauge from the beginning, since the country was fairly densely populated in the 19th century.

Estonia 

Four museum lines and some industrial peat railways survive. The tram network of Estonian capital city Tallinn has the gauge of 1067 mm (3 ft 6 in).

Finland 

The vast majority of Finnish narrow-gauge railways were owned and operated by private companies. There are only a few instances where narrow-gauge railways were in direct connection with each other, and those interchanges did not last for long. The railways never formed a regional rail traffic network, but were only focused on maintaining connections between the national broad-gauge railway network and the off-line industries.

France 

The French National Railways used to run a considerable number of  lines, extensive  gauge lines were also built for the sugar-beet industry in the north often using ex-military equipment after the First World War. Decauville was a famous French manufacturer of industrial narrow-gauge railway equipment and equipped one of the most extensive regional  narrow-gauge railway, the Chemins de fer du Calvados. Corsica has a narrow-gauge network through highly mountainous terrain.

Germany 

A number of narrow-gauge lines survive, largely as a consequence of German reunification, in the former East Germany where some of them form part of the public transport system as active commercial carriers. Most extensive of those still employing steam traction is the Harz mountain group of metre-gauge lines, the Harzer Schmalspurbahnen. Other notable lines are the Zittau-Oybin-Jonsdorf line in Saxony, the Mollibahn and the Rügensche Kleinbahn on the Isle of Rügen on the Baltic coast and the Radebeul-Radeburg line, Weisseritztalbahn in the suburbs of Dresden. Although most rely on the tourist trade, in some areas they provide significant employment as steam traction is particularly labour-intensive.

In the Western part of Germany, Selfkantbahn (close to Heinsberg near Aachen) and Brohltalbahn (Linz/Rhine) are the best known ones, offering services in summer weekends.

Greece 

The Peloponnese narrow-gauge network length is about 914 km. Of this, metre gauge is used for 892 km. This is the network that connects major cities in the Peloponnese. The remaining 22 km form the Diakofton-Kalavryta Rack Railway, which uses  gauge. All passenger service on the metre-gauge network in the Peloponnese (except the Diakofto Kalavrita Railway) was suspended in 2011.

There was also a metre-gauge network in Thessaly. This has now been replaced with single track standard-gauge lines from Volos to Larissa and Palaiofarsalos to Kalampaka. However, the old narrow-gauge tracks remain in place between Velestino and Palaiofarsalos via Aerino, so that occasional special excursion trains use them.

Another small railway which uses narrow gauge  is the Mt. Pelion railway,

A metric line network existed in Attica, operated by Attica Railways and later by SPAP. The line ran from the center of Athens to Kifissia with a branch from Heraklion to Lavrion, finally closed in 1957.

There were also many industrial and military railways in the past.

Hungary 

The former Austria-Hungary empire boasted a narrow-gauge network thousands of kilometres in length, most of it using Bosnian gauge  or  gauge, constructed between 1870 and 1920. Landlords, mines, agricultural and forest estates established their own branch lines which, as they united into regional networks, increasingly played a role in regional passenger traffic. In 1968 the Communist government started to implement a policy to dismantle the narrow-gauge network in favour of road traffic. Since the 1990s a patchwork of railways was gradually taken over by associations and forest managements for tourist purposes. State Railways operated narrow-gauge railways at Nyíregyháza and Kecskemét that played a role in regional transport until December 2009.

Iceland 

No passenger railways have ever been built in Iceland, but the 900 mm gauge Reykjavík Harbour Railway is probably the best known of Iceland's former narrow-gauge lines.

Ireland 

Several  narrow-gauge systems once existed in Ireland. In County Donegal an extensive network existed, with two companies operating from Derry – the Londonderry & Lough Swilly Railway (L&LSR) and the County Donegal Railways (CDRJC). Well known was the West Clare Railway – in County Clare, which saw diesel locomotion before closure. The Cavan & Leitrim Railway (C&LR) operated in what is now the border area of County Cavan and County Leitrim. Some smaller narrow-gauge routes also had existed in County Antrim and also County Cork – notably the Cork Blackrock & Passage Railway – had been removed.

Apart from small heritage venues, the Irish narrow gauge today only survives in the bogs of the Midlands as part of Bord na Móna's extensive industrial network for transporting harvested peat to distribution centres or power plants.

Italy 

Narrow-gauge railways in Italy are (or were) mainly built with  gauge, with some  gauge lines in the north, Bosnian gauge  in the north-east and a few other gauges.

Isle of Man

Both main railways in the Isle of Man are of  gauge. The Isle of Man Steam Railway to the southwest is operated largely as a tourist attraction but the Manx Electric Railway to the northeast is a commercially operated railway system though its operation is closer to that of a tramway than a railway.

Latvia 

Around 1935 narrow-gauge railways consisted of 536 km (335 miles) of  gauge, 432 km (270 miles) of  gauge and 48 km (30 miles) of  gauge.

One public, one museum and some industrial peat railways survive.

Lithuania 

158.8 km of  narrow-gauge lines remain, although only 68.4 km of them (serving five stations) are regularly used, employing 12 locomotives. They are included in the Registry of Immovable Cultural Heritage Sites of Lithuania.

Netherlands 

Numerous industrial narrow-gauge lines were built for peat extraction, clay extraction for brickworks and construction sites.

Nowadays, a lot of this industrial rail heritage is preserved in museums or in theme parks, such as the Efteling Steam Train Company.

A lot of tram lines were also constructed in narrow gauge, the majority in  gauge.

Norway 

In Norway, a number of main lines were in the 19th century built with narrow gauge, . Some secondary railways also had this gauge. These railways have been rebuilt to standard gauge or closed down. Some private railways had  and one had . A few railways partly still are operated as museum railways.

Poland 

The metre-gauge lines are mostly found in the northwest part of the country in Pomerania, while  lines are found only in the Upper Silesia region.  is the most commonly used narrow gauge.

In the past, there have also been ,  and  lines.

Portugal 

Portugal once had hundreds of kilometres of  gauge railways.

Most of them were closed or converted to broad gauge.

Romania 

Romanian narrow-gauge tracks usually use a  gauge, though there were also some  gauge locomotives manufactured at Reşita. Several old narrow-gauge railways in Romania are being renovated for tourist purposes: the one in the Vaser Valley (Maramureș County) is now well known, the line from Abrud to Campeni is sporadically operating and other renovation projects have made tentative steps and may commence regular operations in the near future, such as the Agnita railway line, which has been declared as a historical monument and is now starting to be restored by volunteers. Other forestry narrow-gauge lines with sporadically steam traffic are CFF Moldoviţa (Suceava County)or CFF Covasna-Comandău (Covasna County). More information can be found under "mocăniţă", the term by which such railways are often called in Romanian.

Russia

Of the Russian  railways, only the Sakhalin Railway still exists. This railway was built by Japan who occupied southern Sakhalin after the Russo-Japanese War. The network was extended to the northern part of the island in the Soviet era.

There are numerous  railways serving local industries and communities.

Serbia 

The narrow-gauge railway line in Mokra Gora on the northern slopes of mountain Zlatibor in Serbia climbs a 300-metre ascent using an unusual loop in the form of the figure 8 – the popular "Šargan Eight".

Slovakia 

Bratislava municipal transport system uses  gauge for trams, while Košice transport system uses standard gauge . Railways, however use standard gauge  making Bratislava tram and railways networks incompatible with each other. There is a discussion regarding transforming Bratislava's tram gauge to standard gauge to allow trams to use the railways tracks to increase transportation capabilities of Bratislava's public transportation system. The most notable tourist lines in operation are the  gauge Čiernohronská železnica and Oravsko-kysucká lesná železnica – Vychylovka.
Another notable narrow-gauge tracks include: the Štrbské Pleso - Štrba rack railway and the Tatra Electric Railway (both  gauge) in the Tatra mountains and the  gauge railway from Trenčianska Teplá to Trenčianske Teplice.

Slovenia 

The narrow-gauge railway line was built in the valley of Dravinja, connecting Poljčane–Slovenske Konjice–Zreče (dismantled 1962).

In formerly Italian Istria, a narrow-gauge railway line called Parenzana, a.k.a. Trieste–Buje–Parenzo, connected Trieste (Italy) – Capodistria Koper, Isola d'Istria Izola (Slovenia) – Parenzo Poreč (Croatia) (dismantled).

Spain 

In Spain there is an extensive  system of  gauge railways, in the north of the country, operated by RENFE (until 2013 by FEVE) and EuskoTren. The former FEVE and EuskoTren form the longest narrow-gauge network in Europe.

Near Madrid, on the mountain range of Guadarrama runs a mountain train through a short but extremely sinuous track, operated by Renfe.

Separate metre-gauge railways are operated by the FGC (Ferrocarrils de la Generalitat de Catalunya, Catalan regional government railways), the FGV (Ferrocarrils de la Generalitat Valenciana, Valencian regional government railways).

The SFM (Serveis Ferroviaris de Mallorca) operates on the island of Majorca. Also on the island of Majorca, the FS (Ferrocarril de Sóller) operates a  gauge electrified railway and connecting tramway.

Sweden 

Sweden once had some fairly extensive narrow-gauge networks, but most narrow-gauge railways are now closed. Some were converted to standard gauge (the latest one the line between Berga and Kalmar in the 1970s) and some remain as heritage railways. The most common narrow gauge,  (3 Swedish feet), existed only in Sweden. A smaller  gauge network existed, and  gauge was used mostly by smaller, industrial railways.

Switzerland 

Switzerland boasts extensive networks of  metre-gauge railways, many of which interchange traffic (most prominent is the Rhaetian Railway). The Jungfraubahn terminates at the highest station in Europe. Dual gauge (combined metre- and standard-gauge trackway) also exists in some areas. Also, nearly all street tramways in Switzerland are metre gauge. 

Some railway lines are of a narrower gauge, for example the  gauge Waldenburg railway between Liestal and Waldenburg (but closed in 2021 for conversion to metre gauge and expected to reopen in December 2022) or the  Wengernalp railway in the Bernese Oberland.

Ukraine 

There are three operating passenger  gauge lines in Ukraine: Vynohradiv–Khmilnyk (in Zakarpattia Oblast), Rudnytsia–Holovanivsk (Haivoron line in Vinnytsia Oblast and Kirovohrad Oblast), Antonivka–Zarichne (in Rivne Oblast).

Various Children's railways of  gauge are operational.

United Kingdom 

The United Kingdom once had a large number of narrow-gauge railways which were mostly isolated from each other. The first locomotive-hauled railway in the world was the narrow-gauge Penydarren Tramway in south Wales. Most of the lines were originally built to haul minerals or agricultural products over short distances, though many also carried passengers.

Only a few of these lines survive as commercial common carriers. The great majority of the remaining narrow-gauge lines operate purely as tourist attractions, and a number of new narrow-gauge tourist lines have been built in recent years. The sole passenger-carrying exception is the Glasgow Subway, an underground metro line that operates on a  gauge. The Talyllyn Railway holds the distinction of being the first railway in Britain to be passed by an act of parliament for carrying passengers, and the first railway in the world of any gauge to be preserved and run entirely by volunteers. In addition a few private industrial narrow-gauge railways remain, mainly serving the coal and peat extraction industries.

Amongst the most well-known narrow-gauge lines in Britain are the Ffestiniog – one of the earliest railway organisations in the world – the Vale of Rheidol, and the Welshpool & Llanfair in Wales, the Lynton & Barnstaple, Amerton Railway, the Ravenglass and Eskdale and the Romney, Hythe and Dymchurch, in England. Unique amongst British railways is the rack-and-pinion Snowdon Mountain Railway which climbs to just below the summit of Wales' highest peak.

References

External links